Stephen Nankervis (11 February 1890 – 6 September 1989) was an Australian rules footballer who played with Geelong in the Victorian Football League (VFL).

Notes

External links 

1890 births
1989 deaths
Australian rules footballers from Victoria (Australia)
Geelong Football Club players